The Gay Lord Quex is a 1917 British silent comedy film directed by Maurice Elvey and starring Ben Webster, Irene Vanbrugh and Lilian Braithwaite. It is based on the 1899 play The Gay Lord Quex by Arthur Wing Pinero.

Cast
 Ben Webster - Lord Quex
 Irene Vanbrugh - Sophie Fullgarney
 Lilian Braithwaite - Duchess of Strood
 Hayford Hobbs - Captain Bartling
 Margaret Bannerman - Muriel Eden
 Donald Calthrop - Valma
 Claire Pauncefort - Lady Owbridge
 Lyston Lyle - Frayn

References

External links

1917 films
British silent feature films
1917 comedy films
1910s English-language films
Films directed by Maurice Elvey
British films based on plays
Ideal Film Company films
British comedy films
British black-and-white films
1910s British films
Silent comedy films